Urvarak Nagar Barauni is an Fertilizer plant and township in Barauni, District Begusarai in the Indian state of Bihar. Barauni Fertiliser Plant of Hindustan Fertilizers Corporation Limited (HFCL) is located here in 480 acres.

Barauni Fertiliser Plant
In January 1961, Fertilizer Corporation of India Ltd. (FCI) was created out of the merger of Sindri Fertilizers and Chemicals Ltd. and Hindustan Fertilizer and Chemicals Ltd. Between 1961 and 1977, FCI created seventeen fertilizer units. Seven started operating while the remaining ten were at various stages of implementation.

In 1978 the Government of India set up a committee to reorganize its fertilizer industry. Per the committee's recommendation, the government approved the split of FCI and National Fertilizers Ltd. (NFL), into five separate entities. The newly formed Hindustan Fertilizer Corporation Ltd (HFC) took charge of the Namrup, Haldia, Barauni and Durgapur, while FCI were assigned the Sindri, Gorakhpur, Ramagundam, Talcher, Korba units and the Jodhpur Mining Organization. The other units were allocated to Rashtriya Chemicals and Fertilizers Ltd., National Fertilizers Ltd together with a planning and development company, Project and Development (India) Ltd.
 
On 13 July 2016, Union Cabinet approved revival of Barauni Fertiliser Plant by Hindustan Urvarak and Rasayan Limited (HURL). The contract for revival of Barauni fertiliser plant would be awarded to the SPV (special purpose vehicle) of NTPC, Coal India and IOC in November 2017. In November 2017, Bihar cabinet approved proposal to wave off stamp duty amounting to Rs 216 crore for leasing out 480 acre land of Barauni Fertiliser Plant belonging to Hindustan Fertilizers Corporation Ltd to Hindustan Urvarak and Rasayan Ltd for a period of 55 years for its revival. Back on February 17, 2019, PM Modi laid the foundation stone of the plant.

History
The township was built in the late 1970s to house the employees of The Hindustan Fertilizer Corporation of India Limited's, urea production plant. The installed capacity was 3.3 (lakh-MT).

The Barauni Unit produces urea under the Brand Name "Moti". Production was on 1 January 1999 due to ongoing losses and insufficient subsidies.

Most employees were released via Voluntary Separation Scheme (VSS) in 2002–03. The remaining employees were dismissed during 2003–04.

Layout and facilities
The township is gated, with two entrances. Represented by Postal Code 851115 with a dedicated sub Post Office, it has over 1,500 housing units. Urvarak Nagar is a copybook example of a well laid out township. Situated by National Highway 31 and spread over an area of 280 acres, all arterial roads crisscrossing this township intersect each other at 90°. Amenities include two shopping complexes, a hospital, bank, recreation centers, guest houses and parks. A temple, a mosque, a church and a Gurudwara are also in the township.

Sports facilities include badminton, basketball, cricket, shuttle, soccer, tennis and volleyball. The township has two recreation centers, Vinod Kendra and Fertilizer Officer's Club (F.O.C.).

In the mid-1980s it has been linked to a cable network.

Schools
 Kendriya Vidyalaya Sangathan HFC Barauni (Elementary, Middle & High School)
 DAV Public School (Elementary, Middle & High School)
 KG School (Elementary, Middle)

Kendriya Vidyalaya and DAV Public School are operated by the local administration and respective school committee. KG school closed by 2003.

Transportation
The company provides transport service to and from the factory and to several local destinations including district city Begusarai.

References

Cities and towns in Begusarai district
Barauni